The Falkland Islands wolf (Dusicyon australis), also known as the warrah (  or  ) and occasionally as the Falkland Islands dog, Falkland Islands fox, warrah fox, or Antarctic wolf, was the only native land mammal of the Falkland Islands. This endemic canid became extinct in 1876, the first known canid to have become extinct in historical times.

Traditionally, it had been supposed that the most closely related genus was Lycalopex, including the culpeo, which has been introduced to the Falkland Islands in modern times. A 2009 cladistic analysis of DNA identified the Falkland Islands wolf's closest living relative as the maned wolf (Chrysocyon brachyurus), an unusually long-legged, fox-like South American canid, from which it separated about 6.7 million years ago. However, the Falkland Islands wolf diverged from its mainland ancestor Dusicyon avus very recently, around 16,000 years ago. Dusicyon avus persisted on the South American mainland until around 400 years ago.

The Falkland Islands wolf existed on both West and East Falkland, but Charles Darwin was uncertain if they were differentiated varieties or subspecies. Its fur had a tawny colour and the tip of the tail was white. Its diet is unknown, but due to the absence of native rodents on the Falklands, probably consisted of ground-nesting birds, such as geese and penguins, seal pups and insects, as well as seashore scavenging. It has sometimes been said that it may have lived in burrows.

History

The first recorded sighting was by Capt. John Strong in 1690. Captain Strong took one of the animals on his ship, but during the voyage back to Europe the creature became frightened by the firing of the ship's cannon and jumped overboard.  Louis Antoine de Bougainville, who established the first settlement in the Falkland Islands termed it a loup-renard ("wolf-fox"). The name "warrah" is an anglicised approximation of the term aguará (meaning "fox" in Guaraní, a Native American language), because of its similarity to the maned wolf (aguará guazú). 

When Charles Darwin visited the islands in 1833 he found the species present in both West and East Falkland and tame. However, at the time of his visit the animal was already very rare on East Falkland, and even on West Falkland its numbers were declining rapidly. By 1865, it was no longer found on the eastern part of East Falkland. He predicted that the animal would join the dodo among the extinct within "a very few years." It was hunted for its valuable fur, and the settlers, regarding the wolf as a threat to their sheep, poisoned it. However, the belief that Falkland Islands wolf was a threat to sheep was probably due to the sheep mistaking the Falkland Islands wolves for dogs (especially at night), and, in terror, the sheep ran into bogs and swamps, where they became lost. There were no forests for the animal to hide in, and it had no fear of humans; it was possible to lure the animal with a chunk of meat held in one hand, and kill it with a knife or stick held in the other. However, it would defend itself occasionally if it needed to, as Admiral George Grey noted when they landed on West Falkland at Port Edgar on 17 December 1836:

A live wolf was taken to London Zoo, England in 1868. Another "Antarctic wolf" arrived in 1870. Neither animal survived long. Only a dozen or so museum specimens exist today.

In 1880, after the animal had become extinct, Thomas Huxley classified it as related to the coyote. In 1914, Oldfield Thomas moved it to the genus Dusicyon, with the culpeo and other South American foxes. (These other canids have since been removed to Lycalopex.)

Darwin's description
Darwin writing about his 1834 visit to the Falklands in his Journal and Remarks (The Voyage of the Beagle) has the following to say of Canis antarcticus:

Biogeography and evolution

Darwin's comments
When organising his notes on the last stage of the Beagle expedition, Darwin wrote of his growing suspicions that the differences between the various Galápagos Islands mockingbirds and tortoises, as well as the possible dissimilarity of West Falkland and East Falkland Islands wolves, were but variants that differed depending on which island they came from:

The word "would" was added after this passage was first written, suggesting a cautious qualification from his initial bold statement. He later wrote that such facts "seemed to me to throw some light on the origin of species".

Related species 
A DNA analysis and a study of comparative brain anatomy suggest that the closest living relative of the Falkland Islands wolf is the South American maned wolf. Their most recent common ancestor was estimated to have lived some 6 million years ago and was close to the most recent common ancestor of all South American canids, Eucyon or a close relative. It would seem that the lineages of the maned wolf and the Falkland Islands wolf separated in North America; canids did not appear in South America until roughly 3 million years ago in a paleozoogeographical event called the Great American Biotic Interchange, in which the continents of North and South America were newly connected by the formation of the Isthmus of Panama. However, no fossil from North America can be assigned to the Falkland Islands wolf or its immediate ancestors.

Dusicyon avus, known from fossils from southern South America as recent as 400 years ago, was the closet known relative of the Falkland Islands wolf.

In terms of skull shape and feeding habits, the animal was an opportunistic predator, more like a jackal.

Biogeographical isolation on the Falklands
The route by which the Falkland Islands wolf was established in the islands was unknown for a long time, as the islands have never been connected to the mainland and there are no other native land mammals. No other oceanic island as remote as the Falklands has a native canid; the island fox of California in the US  and Darwin's fox of Chile both inhabit islands much closer to a continent.

Berta and other authors suggest that it was unlikely that the wolf's ancestors could have survived the last Ice Age on the Falklands and they must therefore have arrived later, within the last ten thousand years, crossing a wide expanse of the South Atlantic. Its close relative, Dusicyon avus, did survive in South America until a few thousand years ago, but swimming such a distance or even drifting on a floating log would appear effectively impossible for the wolf. A study by a University of Maine team in 2021 reports evidence of potential visitation to the islands by indigenous South Americans before the Age of Discovery. The authors speculated that the ancestors of the wolf could have been domesticated and brought with the visitors. There is, however, no definite evidence that humans ever visited the Falklands before the Age of Discovery nor is there any evidence that the ancestors of the wolf were ever domesticated.

The oldest known remains of Falklands Islands wolves date to approximately 3396–3752 years Before Present, found at Spring Point Farm in West Falkland, the only place in the Falkland Islands where subfossil bones of the wolf have been found. The scarcity of remains is likely due to the acidic peaty soil of most of the Falklands, which rapidly degrades bones.

Genetics 
DNA of the extinct mainland relative, D. avus, analyzed in 2013 suggests that its genetic history diverged from the Falkland Islands wolf only some 16,000 years ago, during the last glacial phase. This is strong evidence that the ancestors of the wolf were isolated on the islands only since the last glacial maximum. A 2009 analysis of mitochondrial DNA from five museum specimens of the Falkland Islands wolf indicated that they had multiple mitochondrial haplotypes whose most recent common ancestor lived about 330,000 years ago, giving some idea of the genetic diversity of the founding population.

Ice Age land bridge 
An Ice Age land bridge or ice connection between the Falkland Islands and South America, enabling the species' ancestors to traverse the gap, has long been suggested. There was never a true land bridge between the islands and South America, but submarine terraces have been found on the Argentine coastal shelf, formed by low sea-stands during the last glacial phase. This suggests that there was a shallow strait as narrow as 20 km, which may have frozen completely at times. It is possible that the founding population of the wolf crossed on this ice bridge during the last Ice Age. The absence of other mainland mammals on the islands might be due to the difficulty of an ice crossing.

In culture

Locations that are named after the wolf:
 Fox Bay, a bay and settlement on West Falkland
 Warrah River, West Falkland

See also
 Holocene extinction

References

Sources

External links 
 The warrah

 Falklands Conservation
 Site, includes three pictures of the Warrah
 Darwin's Wolf Mystery Solved

1876 disestablishments in the Falkland Islands
Dusicyon
Wolf
Carnivorans of South America
Extinct canines
Extinct mammals of South America
Wolf
Species made extinct by deliberate extirpation efforts
Mammal extinctions since 1500
Mammals described in 1792